The Dent Blanche Hut (French: Cabane de la Dent Blanche or Cabane Rossier) is a mountain hut of the Swiss Alpine Club, located south of Les Haudères in the canton of Valais. The hut lies at a height of 3,507 metres above sea level, at the foot of the Dent Blanche in the Pennine Alps. The hut, located at the upper end of the valley of Hérens near the watershed with the valley of Zermatt, overlooks the Ferpècle Glacier.

All accesses to the hut involve glacier crossing.

See also
List of buildings and structures above 3000 m in Switzerland

References
Swisstopo topographic maps

External links 

Official website
Dent Blanche Hut on Hikr

Mountain huts in Switzerland
Buildings and structures in Valais
Mountain huts in the Alps